Petrus Matthias Snickers (11 April 1816 in Rotterdam – 2 April 1895 in Utrecht) was a Dutch clergyman.

Snickers was named Bishop of Haarlem and consecrated on 2 September 1877 at Haarlem Cathedral, by Andreas Ignatius Schaepman, Primate of Netherlands.  He was appointed Archbishop of Utrecht in 1883 and lead the Archdiocese until his death in 1895.

1816 births
1895 deaths
Archbishops of Utrecht
19th-century Roman Catholic archbishops in the Netherlands
Clergy from Rotterdam
Roman Catholic bishops of Haarlem-Amsterdam
Dutch Roman Catholic archbishops